Lê Quang Trị (1508–1516) was briefly emperor of Later Lê dynasty in 1516.

Biography
Lê Quang Trị was born in 1508 at Đông Kinh. He was the son of prince  who was killed by emperor Lê Uy Mục in 1509. However, Trịnh Duy Đại was defeated in battle by his cousin  who supported Lê Y. So he received Lê Quang Trị to  about May 1516, then he killed Lê Quang Trị and the emperor's two brothers. Lê Quang Trị only kept the throne for three days.

References

 
 

Q
Vietnamese monarchs
Monarchs who died as children
1508 births
1516 deaths